Mopti Cercle  is an administrative subdivision of the Mopti Region of Mali. The administrative center (chef-lieu) is the town of Mopti.

The cercle is divided into 15 communes:

Bassirou
Borondougou
Dialloubé
Fatoma
Konna
Korombana
Koubaye
Kounari
Mopti
Ouro Modi
Ouroubé Douddé
Sasalbé
Sio
Socoura
Soye

References

Cercles of Mali
Ségou Region